Malediction is a 1993 EP released by Einstürzende Neubauten.

The EP's cover includes a painting by Ambrosius Bosschaert. Elsewhere on the sleeve the group thanks the art historian Claus Grimm and recommends his book Stilleben.

Track listing
"Blume" (French Version) - 4:35
"Blume" (English Version) - 4:31
"Blume" (Japanese Version) - 4:31
"Ubique Media Daemon" - 4:31
"3 Thoughts" - 4:40
"Ring My Bell" - 1:05

Personnel
Diana Orlof - vocals, translation on "Blume" French version
Anita Lane - vocals, translation on "Blume" English version
Etsuko Sakamaki-Haas - vocals on "Blume" Japanese version and "Ring My Bell", translation on "Blume" Japanese version
Thomas Wydler - snare drum on "Ubique Media Daemon"

External links
 Malediction at discogs.com

Einstürzende Neubauten albums
1993 EPs
Mute Records EPs